The Two-man bobsleigh competition at the 1972 Winter Olympics in Sapporo was held on 4 and 5 February, at Sapporo Teine.

Results

References

Bobsleigh at the 1972 Winter Olympics